The Nera (or Нера) is a  river running through Romania and Serbia. It is a left tributary of the Danube, which it joins near Banatska Palanka. The Nera is not navigable.

Romania 

The Nera rises in the Semenic mountains, the easternmost part of the Banat region, south of the city of Reșița, in the Caraș-Severin County of Romania. Its source is near the mountain resort Semenic, from where it flows south. Its uppermost part, upstream from the confluence with the Nerganița, is also called Nergana. Reaching the village of Borlovenii Vechi, the Nera turns southwest, flowing between the Semenic and Banat Mountains. In this section, the Nera receives its left tributary, the Rudăria, and passes next to many villages (Prilipeț, Dalboșeț, Moceriș), until it reaches Șopotu-Nou, where it sharply turns to the northwest, still curving around the Semenic mountains. It passes next to the villages of Sasca Română, Sasca Montana, Slatina Nera and Naidăș, at which point it becomes the border between Romania and Serbia for the remaining .

Border River 

In the border section, the Nera flows through the depression of Bela Crkva (Belocrkvanska kotlina; Cyrillic: Белоцркванска котлина), and settlements on the Romanian side include Lescovița, Zlatița and Socol, while on the Serbian side there is only one village on the river itself, Kusić, with several settlements in the vicinity of the river: Kaluđerovo, the town of Bela Crkva, Vračev Gaj and Banatska Palanka. At Vračev Gaj the river turns south and empties into the Danube near the village of Stara Palanka.

The mouth itself is a popular fishing spot.

Lake Đerdap 

After the filling of the artificial Lake Đerdap, as a result of the Iron Gate I Hydroelectric Power Station which was finished in 1972, the mouth of the river into the Danube was flooded. In order to allow the optimal electricity production, the water level of the Nera at the mouth should not go below , while it must not exceed it if the flooding of the banks is to be avoided. Since the mid-1990s, there are significant problems in fixing the river's level, as the process is costly and complicated. In 2018, representatives of Romania and Serbia signed an agreement to solve the problem.

Settlements located near the river 

In Romania: Prigor, Bozovici, Dalboșeț, Șopotu Nou, Sasca Montană, Naidăș, Socol

In Serbia: Kusić, Bela Crkva, Vračev Gaj, Banatska Palanka, Stara Palanka

Tributaries 

The following are tributaries of the Nera (from source to mouth):

Left: Nerganița, Prigor, Rudăria, Bănia, Gârbovăț, Șopot, Bârz, Boinița, Răchita, Ogașu Mare, Haimeliug, Ogașu Porcului, Ulmu Mare, Ogașu Porcariului, Șușara, Fântâna Seacă, Micoș, Pârloagele

Right: Beg, Coșava, Hielișag, Pătășel, Miniș, Agriș, Lăpușnic, Oreștica, Moceriș, Ducin, Bresnic, Ogașu Alunilor, Radovanu, Valea Rea, Padina Seacă, Lindina, Beu, Năidășel

See also 
List of rivers of Romania
List of rivers of Serbia

References 

 Mala Prosvetina Enciklopedija, Third edition (1985); Prosveta; 
 Jovan Đ. Marković (1990): Enciklopedijski geografski leksikon Jugoslavije; Svjetlost-Sarajevo; 

Rivers of Romania
Rivers of Serbia
Geography of Vojvodina
 
Rivers of Caraș-Severin County
Romania–Serbia border